NGC 1260 is a spiral or lenticular galaxy in the constellation Perseus. It was discovered by astronomer Guillaume Bigourdan on 19 October 1884. NGC 1260 is a member of the Perseus Cluster and forms a tight pair with the galaxy PGC 12230. In 2006, it was home to the second brightest supernova in the observable universe, supernova SN 2006gy.

References

External links
 
 Brightest object found in NGC 1260 (Space.com : 7 May 2007)
 http://www.solstation.com/x-objects/sn2006gy.htm
 

Spiral galaxies
Perseus (constellation)
1260
12219
02634
Astronomical objects discovered in 1884
Perseus Cluster
Lenticular galaxies